The Rt Revd Dr  Vibert Jackson was a Colonial Anglican Bishop in the Windward Islands from 1930 until 1936.

He was born in 1874 and educated at the City of London School and  Keble College, Oxford  and  ordained in 1899. His first post was as a curate at St Matthews, Newcastle upon Tyne after which he was a missionary priest in Calcutta and then curate in charge of the Mission of the Holy Spirit, Newcastle upon Tyne.  From 1906 to 1913 he was Vicar of St Michael and St George, Fulwell then Archdeacon in Central America and later of Grenada before his elevation to the episcopate.

Following his retirement from the Windward Islands, he was Vicar of All Souls, South Ascot (from 1940), and was an Assistant Bishop of Oxford (from late 1951). He held both posts at his death on 19 January 1963. There is a memorial to him at St George's Cathedral, St Vincent. He is buried at All Souls, South Ascot, on the southern edge of the churchyard.

Notes

1874 births
Anglican clergy from London
People educated at the City of London School
Alumni of Keble College, Oxford
English Anglican missionaries
Anglican archdeacons in Central America
20th-century Anglican bishops in the Caribbean
Anglican bishops of the Windward Islands
1963 deaths
Archdeacons of Grenada
Deans of St George's Cathedral, Kingstown
Anglican missionaries in India